Ronald Powell may also refer to:

 Ron Powell, English goalkeeper
 Ronald Powell (Australian cricketer) (1883–1922), Australian cricketer
 Ronald Powell (Nevisian cricketer) (born 1968), Nevisian cricketer
 Ronald Powell (footballer) (born 1947), English striker
 Ronald Powell (rower) (1884–1930), English rower
 Ronald Powell (born 1992), American football linebacker.
 Ronnie Powell (American football) (born 1974), American football wide receiver / kick returner